S D Arvinda is a film director and music composer from the Kannada film industry in India. He debuted as a film director with the Kannada feature Jugari in 2010.  Jugari was listed among the top 10 movies of 2010, according to a report by weekly magazine Sudha.

A Masters of Science in Mass Communication, Arvinda made his entry into the visual media through television soon after completing college in 1998. Being the grandson of the legendary Kannada comedian Narasimharaju, Arvind started off with a programme on his grandfather, working along with his aunt, which was aired on Doordarshan, titled Haasya Chakravarhi.

He made his documentary debut with Avalokana, a cultural video magazine, produced by the Information and Publicity Department, Govt. of Karnataka.

He directed and composed music for his 2016 horror thriller Last Bus.

Filmography

References

Living people
Kannada film directors
Kannada film producers
Year of birth missing (living people)